Coordinación de Informaciones de Estado (State Intelligence Coordination, CIDE) was the first Argentine civilian intelligence agency created in 1946 by Juan Perón, who was the de facto Argentine vice president at the time. It is the predecessor of Secretaría de Informaciones de Estado and the current Secretaría de Inteligencia

See also
Rodolfo Freude
List of Secretaries of Intelligence
National Intelligence System
National Intelligence School
Directorate of Judicial Surveillance
National Directorate of Criminal Intelligence
National Directorate of Strategic Military Intelligence

1946 establishments in Argentina
Defunct Argentine intelligence agencies